Admiral Acton may refer to:

Alfredo Acton (1867–1934), Italian rear admiral
Ferdinando Acton (1832–1891), Italian admiral
Guglielmo Acton (1825–1896), Italian admiral
John C. Acton (fl. 1970s–2000s), U.S. Coast Guard rear admiral